Turnpike Lane may refer to:

 Turnpike Lane, Haringey, a street in the London Borough of Haringey
 Turnpike Lane tube station